Jason Afrikaner (born October 23, 1993) is a Namibian freestyle wrestler.

Major results

References

1993 births
Living people
Namibian male sport wrestlers
Wrestlers at the 2010 Summer Youth Olympics
20th-century Namibian people
21st-century Namibian people